Martin Weldon Honan  (May 29, 1869 – August 20, 1908), was a Major League Baseball player who played catcher for the Chicago Colts of the National League. He appeared in six games for the Colts from 1890 to 1891.

External links

1869 births
1908 deaths
Major League Baseball catchers
Chicago Colts players
19th-century baseball players
Peoria Canaries players
Minneapolis Millers (baseball) players
Baseball players from Chicago
Chicago Whitings players